Ambiri is a village and seat of the commune of Dirma in the Cercle of Youwarou in the Mopti Region of southern-central Mali.

References

External links
.
.

Populated places in Mopti Region